Lega Basket Femminile (LBF) is the premier national league for women's basketball clubs in Italy, founded in 1930. Pool Comense is the competition's most successful club with fifteen championships, followed by AS Vicenza with twelve and Geas Basket with seven, while PF Schio and Cras Taranto have been the leading teams in recent years. 

Currently both the champion and runner-up are granted spots in the Euroleague. The Serie A champions were the major force in the 1980s, with Geas Basket, Fiat Torino, AS Vicenza, Libertas Trogylos, Polisportiva Ahena and Pool Comense winning eleven editions between 1978 and 1995.

List of champions
 Comense
 1950, 1951, 1952, 1953, 1991, 1992, 1993, 1994, 1995, 1996, 1997, 1998, 1999, 2002, 2004
 Vicenza
 1965, 1966, 1967, 1968, 1969, 1982, 1983, 1984, 1985, 1986, 1987, 1988
 Schio
 2005, 2006, 2008, 2011, 2013, 2014, 2015, 2016, 2018, 2019
 Geas
 1970, 1971, 1972, 1974, 1975, 1976, 1978
 Triestina
 1930, 1931, 1956, 1957, 1958
 Torino
 1962, 1963, 1964, 1979, 1980
 Canottieri
 1933, 1934, 1935, 1943
 Ambrosiana
 1936, 1937, 1938, 1939
 Bernocchi
 1947, 1948, 1954, 1955
 Cras Taranto
 2003, 2009, 2010, 2012
 Udinese
 1959, 1960, 1961
 Libertas Trogylos
 1989, 2000
 Gioiosa
 1932
 Ilva Trieste
 1940
 Napoli
 1941
 CUS Milano
 1942
 Reyer Venezia
 1946
 Indomita
 1949
 Standa
 1973
 Treviso
 1981
 Ahena
 1990
 Parma
 2001
 Vomero
 2007
 Lucca
 2007

References

 

Women's basketball competitions in Italy
Basketball leagues in Italy
Italy
Sports leagues established in 1924